The Right to Happiness is a 1915 American silent short drama film directed by Tom Ricketts starring  Jack Richardson, Louise Lester, Vivian Rich, Harry von Meter, and Joseph Galbraith.

External links

1915 films
1915 drama films
Silent American drama films
American silent short films
American black-and-white films
1915 short films
Films directed by Tom Ricketts
1910s American films